The MG SV Xpower is a sports car that was produced by British automobile manufacturer MG Rover. Manufactured in Modena, Italy and finished at Longbridge, United Kingdom, it was based on the platform of the Qvale Mangusta, formerly the De Tomaso Biguà, itself using parts from the Ford Mustang.

History
After acquiring Italian automobile manufacturer Qvale, MG Rover allocated the project code X80, and set up the subsidiary company, MG X80 Ltd., to produce a new model based on the Qvale Mangusta. One attraction was the potential sales in the United States, as the Mangusta had already been homologated, for the market in the United States.

The MG X80 was originally unveiled as the concept car, in June 2001. However, the styling was considered too sedate. When the production model, now renamed MG XPower SV, was eventually launched the following year, Peter Stevens, previously the exterior designer of the McLaren F1, had made the car's styling more aggressive.

The conversion from a clay model to a production car, including all requirements, was done in just three hundred days, by the Swedish company, Caran. The goal was to get a retail price of under £100,000. The car's base model eventually cost £65,000, with the uprated model XPower SVR, costing £83,000.

The production process was complex, partly caused by the use of carbon fibre, to make the body panels. The basic body parts were made in the United Kingdom by SP Systems, and then shipped to Belco Avia, near Turin, for assembly into body panels.

These were then assembled into a complete body shell, and fitted onto the box frame chassis and running gear, and shipped to the factory of MG Rover, in Longbridge, to be trimmed and finished. Several of the cars’ exterior and interior parts, were sourced from current and past models of Fiat.

The headlights, for example, were taken from the second generation Punto, and the rear lights from the Fiat Coupé. Exterior door handles from a MG TF, Mirrors, Window switches and interior door handles from the Rover 75. In total, the production process required each vehicle to visit six different companies. According to the data at the MG XPower SV Club, approximately 82 cars were produced, excluding the four 'XP' pre production prototypes.

This included the few pre production and show cars, which were later dismantled before production was stopped, due to lack of sales. Most were sold to private owners, with the final ones being sold to customers, at the beginning of 2008. Three vehicles, that had been produced, but not assembled, were acquired by classic car dealer Eclectic Cars Limited in March 2013, and later completed. Another partially completed chassis is in storage with a private owner in the UK.

Most were sold in Europe and Asia, with only one model sold in America, the supercharged model, the XP.

The decision to develop a niche sports car, rather than work on replacements for its core family cars, has been described as symptomatic of the strategic mistakes, that ultimately led to MG Rover's untimely demise. By the time that the company entered administration in April 2005, only nine XPower SVs had been sold. Rowan Atkinson purchased an XPower SV in February 2005.

Variants 

Club Sport options, for customers who wished to use their SV on the track, were planned but never produced.

The XPower SV R, released the following year, features a Roush tuned, “cammer” 5.0 L 32 valve Modular V8.

Unlike the base model SV, the SVR was offered with a choice of either manual or automatic transmissions.

Performance 
Performance data, for the range of the MG XPower SV:

XPower WR
In July 2008, William Riley, who claims to be a descendant of the dynasty of Riley Motor, although this has been disputed, bought XPower SV related assets from the administrators of MG Rover, PricewaterhouseCoopers. Riley formed MG Sports and Racing Europe Ltd to continue production of the model. MG Sports and Racing Europe, based in Eardiston, near Tenbury Wells in Worcestershire, announced the relaunch of the XPower SV in April 2008, under the name MG XPower WR.

Riley's use of the "MG" trademark resulted in a legal dispute with Nanjing Automobile (Group) Corporation, which had also acquired assets of the defunct MG Rover Group. This case was won by Nanjing in February 2010.

It was reported in the press in December 2009, that no new cars had been manufactured by MG Sports and Racing Europe since its founding, and that employment tribunal proceedings had been initiated by two employees, for non payment of wages. Riley was also arrested by police in December 2009, on suspicion of theft of an XPower WR car, previously sold to one Canadian businessman, who had been working on behalf of the company.

References

XPower SV
Coupés
Rear-wheel-drive vehicles
Sports cars
Cars introduced in 2003